Mark John Greatbatch (born 11 December 1963) is a former New Zealand international cricketer. He scored more than 2,000 runs in his 41 Test matches for New Zealand. A left-handed batsman and very occasional right-arm medium pace bowler in first class cricket for Auckland and Central Districts, Greatbatch scored 9,890 first class runs in total as well as being an occasional wicket keeper.

International career
Greatbatch highest test score of 146 not out off 485 balls was against Australia at Perth in November 1989. Greatbatch was at the crease for 11 hours (2 days) to save New Zealand from defeat, the game ending in a draw because of his efforts. He received a standing ovation at the end of the game. Greatbatch's defensive innings is still considered by many pundits to be one of the greatest cricket centuries ever, under the circumstances.

For the 1992 Cricket World Cup Greatbatch was not selected to play in the first match, against Australia. However, he was selected to open against South Africa in place of John Wright, who had been injured, and proceeded to bat aggressively to take advantage of fielding restrictions early in the innings. The strategy worked, so was repeated again throughout the World Cup and Greatbatch became one of the first 'pinch hitter' players to open an innings in One Day Internationals. Because of this success other cricketing nations, notably Sri Lanka, adopted the idea of opening with an aggressive batsman who normally plays in the middle order of test matches to score quick runs early and this tactic is now common in international cricket.

Mark Greatbatch finished his career with 2,021 Test runs and 2,206 ODI runs.

After cricket

In September 2005 he became director of coaching at Warwickshire County Cricket Club in England. After relegation from both the County Championship and Pro40 League in 2007 he was replaced by Ashley Giles. In January, 2010, Greatbatch was appointed the coach of the New Zealand national cricket team.

In 2022, Asterix, a horse that Greatbatch partly owned, won the New Zealand Derby.

References

External links

1963 births
Living people
Auckland cricketers
Central Districts cricketers
New Zealand One Day International cricketers
New Zealand Test cricketers
Cricketers who made a century on Test debut
Cricketers at the 1992 Cricket World Cup
New Zealand cricketers
Cricketers from Auckland
New Zealand national cricket team selectors
New Zealand cricket coaches
Marylebone Cricket Club cricketers
Coaches of the New Zealand national cricket team
M Parkinson's World XI cricketers
North Island cricketers